Carmona, officially the Municipality of Carmona, is a 1st class municipality in the province of Cavite, Philippines. According to the 2020 census, it has a population of 106,256 people.

Etymology
Carmona was formerly a settlement called Latag, which was annexed to the town of Silang upon the latter's creation in 1595. The origins of its name are unknown. In 1856, the settlement's inhabitants demanded for the conversion of Latag into a town, spearheaded by Tiburcio Purificacion.

By virtue of a decree issued on February 20, 1857, by Queen Isabella II of Spain through Governor General Fernándo Norzagaray y Escudero, Latag became a separate municipality with the name it bears today: Carmona, named after the town of Carmona in the province of Seville, Spain.

History
Carmona was just a part of Silang. This is not surprising because in the early part of the Spanish regime, Silang included what are known today as the municipalities of Indang, San Francisco de Malabon (now General Trias), and Maragondon. Moreover, Alfonso, Amadeo, and Mendez were mere sitios of Indang; Santa Cruz de Malabon (now Tanza) was a part of San Francisco de Malabon or Malabon Grande; and Magallanes and Ternate were barrios of Maragondon. Furthermore, Maragondon itself had been a part of the Corregimiento of Mariveles on the opposite side of Manila Bay.

According to research conducted in 1982, by Sangguniang Bayan members Ernesto Zamora, Salvador P. Manahan, Pio Purificacion, Narciso Levardo, and Romy Laurito, assisted by Municipal Secretary Rogelio D. Paular, it was found out that the history of Carmona began during the 15th century. As related by a reliable informant, three brothers coming from the mountain of Silang were said to be the first settlers in the place which was then called  “Latag”, a Tagalog word for “plain” due to the numerous hills and plains in the area. The settlement was not known to other residents of Silang until some of them also went down to the place, cleared some forest areas and established their residence.

During the Philippine Revolution in 1896, the gobernadorcillo of Carmona was Kapitan Damian Ermitano after the administrations of Tiburcio Purificacion, Mariano Mapanoo and Donald C. Virtucio, Augusto Manaog and Fabian Tenedero.

After the revolution and the occupation of the country by the Americans in 1901, the first local executive of Carmona was Martin Reyes who was followed next by Marcelo Reyes, Prudencio Torres, Juan Alumia, Estanislao Paular, Marciano Mapanoo, and Juan Zamora.

The mayors who assumed office after World War II were Bernardo Hebron, Eulalio Reyes and Cesar Casal and Felino L. Maquinay. In 1959, the district of San Gabriel and San Jose of Barangay Kabilang Baybay were purchased by the National Government for the relocation of squatters from Metro Manila. On March 14, 1981, the relocation site, which teemed with people from almost every part of the country and was more popularly known as the resettlement area, became an independent municipality called General Mariano Alvarez.

Cityhood
On June 30, 2022, House Bill No. 108 was filed by Cavite's 5th congressional district representative and former Carmona mayor Roy Loyola for the conversion of the municipality of Carmona into a component city. It was substituted with House Bill No. 3968 filed last August 24, 2022.

On September 5, 2022, the measure was approved by the House of Representatives on final reading. It was transmitted and received by the Senate on September 6, 2022. On January 30, 2023, the Senate approved the bill on third and final reading.

Republic Act No. 11938, a law which will convert Carmona into a component city, was signed by President Bongbong Marcos on February 23, 2023. A plebiscite will be held within 60 days from the approval of the law for the ratification of its cityhood.

Timeline of Carmona
 1500–1600 → Carmona history started with three brothers that came to the land of Carmona that was at that time called Labac.
 1595 → Silang became a town; the former Sitio Labac became Barrio Latag.
 March 9, 1746 → They determined the boundaries of Silang and Biñan under a decree signed by Mayor Pedro Calderon Enriquez.
 November 15, 1759 → Two years after securing the independence of Carmona, the principales requested the Governor of Cavite for the reversal of the Canon on communal lands after constructing their own public buildings and irrigation works.
 1838 → The movement of the inhabitants of Latag to become a town started.
 February 20, 1857 → Because of the great distance to the mother town, the principales and incumbent Cabeza de Barangay of Latag petitioned for its separation and conversion into a municipality. The new town was called Carmona, after a town of the same name in the Spanish province of Seville.
 April 16, 1857 → They set the boundaries of Silang and Carmona.
 September 15, 1859 → The inhabitants of Carmona returned to managing and ownership of communal lands.
 January 22, 1864 → The incumbent gobernadorcillo and principales of Carmona petitioned higher authorities for the abolition of the repartimiento of the communal lands triennially.
 1872 → The communal lands were sold at public auction, which was opposed two years later by Don Gaspar Espiritu in a communication to the Superior Civil Governor.
 October 25, 1874 → An event of great significance to the people of Carmona was a strong typhoon, which wrought considerable damage to the public works and private property.
 July 6, 1881 → Seven years later, the principales of Carmona requested the rectification of the town's boundaries.
 1941 → The inhabitants of Carmona renewed the demand for "homestead" land.
 1959 → The district of San Gabriel and San Jose of Barangay Cabilang Baybay was purchased by the National Government for the relocation of squatters from Metro Manila.
 March 14, 1981 → The relocation site, which teemed with people from almost every part of the country and was more popularly known as resettlement area, became an independent municipality called General Mariano Alvarez.
 February 23, 2023 → Republic Act No. 11938, which would convert Carmona into a component city, was signed.

Geography
It is bounded on the north, east and south by the City of Biñan, Laguna, Municipality of General Mariano Alvarez (GMA) on the north-west and Silang on the south-west. The geographic coordinates of Carmona are about 14.32° latitude and 121.06° longitude.

The topography of Carmona is generally flat to strongly rolling or sloping, partly lowland and partly hill. Carmona is divided into four physiographical areas: the lowest lowland area, the lowland area, the central hilly area and the upland mountainous area.

The town is also within the path of a fault line, the Valley Fault System which starts from the Sierra Madre mountains.

Barangays

Carmona is subdivided into 14 barangays (the smallest local government unit) which handles governance in a much smaller area.

 Bancal
 Barangay 1
 Barangay 2
 Barangay 3
 Barangay 4
 Barangay 5
 Barangay 6
 Barangay 7
 Barangay 8
 Cabilang Baybay
 Lantic 
 Mabuhay
 Maduya
 Milagrosa

Land area
With a total land area of 29,749,874 square meters, Carmona represented 2.17% of the total land area of the province. These areas are currently occupied by 14 barangays of which 7 are considered Poblacion barangays and 7 others are regular barangays. Barangay Lantic is the largest area while Barangay 2 has the smallest area.

Climate
Carmona has a Type I climate characterized by two pronounced seasons: dry from November to April and wet during rest of the year. Maximum rainfall usually occurs from June to September. The average annual rainfall is 200 millimeters with a peak of 400 millimeters in August.

The average annual temperature is 27.2 C. The highest temperature occurs during the month of May while the lowest occurs during the month of January.

The predominant wind direction comes from the south-west during the month of June to September and from the north-west during the month of October to January, while from February to April, the wind is coming from the southeast, predominantly in the month of May.

The average humidity of Carmona is 81%. This makes the municipality cooler than the Metropolitan Manila Area where the average humidity is higher.

Soil properties
The eastern side of Cavite consists of Carmona clay loam with streaks of Carmona clay loam steep phase and Carmona sandy clay loam. This type of soil is granular with tuffaceous material and concretions. It is hard and compact when dry, sticky and plastic when wet. This type of soil is planted with rice with irrigation or sugarcane without irrigation. Fruit trees such as mango, avocado and citrus are also grown in this type of soil.

Mineral resources
Cavite coastal areas have marl and conglomerate sedimentary rocks and some igneous rocks which are prominent in the high, mountainous regions of the western part of the province. Carmona reserves and deposits of sand, clay and gravel materials are found in Sitio Ulong Tubig, Mabuhay.

Demographics

In the 2010 census, Carmona had a total population of 74,986 which represented a total number of households at 14,885.

Population density
The highest densities are found in the Poblacion area (Barangays 1–8) and Barangays Milagrosa and Maduya, where land areas are significantly lower than the other barangays. Barangay Lantic posted development of the Kuok Property within the Lantic area; it is expected that the density will increase within the ten-year period.

Population distribution

Carmona's population is concentrated in Barangays 1–8 at the Poblacion area. Barangay Lantic is the most populated barangay, which posted a total population of 24,721. Dense population is also found in Barangay 9, the central business district of the municipality. Most population catalysts such as banks, town center, and commercial establishments are found in the Poblacion area.

Language

The main language spoken is Tagalog. In some areas they speak Chabacano or Chavacano, sometimes referred to by linguists as Philippine Creole Spanish, a Spanish-based creole language spoken in the Philippines. English is considered as the second language and is widely used as medium of communication in business and higher education. Other Philippine languages spoken are Waray, Bicolano, Cebuano, Ilokano, Pangasinense, and Hiligaynon. Chinese and Spanish are also spoken by some local residents.

Religion
The majority of inhabitants are composed of Roman Catholics, Protestants and other non-denominational groups.

Economy

Cottage industries include metal works, metalcraft, footwear industries, concrete products, tricycle assembly, rattan handicrafts and bakeries. Manufacturing firms engaged in handicraft (bags and shoes), furniture making, business retailing, personal and business services, and food based enterprises contribute to the municipality's trade and commerce. Mercantile activities in the municipality are concentrated at the Poblacion area and along Governor's Drive. Carmona has been classified as a first class municipality since July 1996, brought about by industrialization, real estate development and commercial activities.

Garment industries, steel fabrication, microchips and semi-conductors, tool fabrication, bus assembly, bulb factories, die casting and other small and medium-scale industries currently operate in the municipality. These investments continue to provide local employment, generate export earnings, increase municipal revenues and serve as vehicles for technology transfer. Foreign investments are pouring in as export-oriented industries continue to flourish.

Employment rate: Out of a potential labor force of 24,918 (members 15 years old & above who are actively seeking for work), 98.03% are employed while 1.97% are unemployed. The presence of 8 industrial estates & 2 industrial compounds contribute largely to the high employment rate of the municipality.

Agriculture

The economy of Carmona is generally agricultural. Almost half of its total land area is devoted to agriculture.

There are 217 farmers in the Municipality engaged in planting and farming. Crops and livestock farmers are distributed among 14 barangays of Carmona.

However, with the implementation of the CALABARZON growth area, the municipality of Carmona has slowly become an industrial enclave in the province. The advent of industrialization has threatened the agricultural base of Carmona. As of April 1999, land used for rice production has gone down; sugarcane plantation has decreased considerably and those land uses for other crops and vegetables totaled  during the same year.

At present, the programs and services of the Department of Agriculture (DA) are focused on five priority programs: a sustained self-sufficiency program for rice and corn, strengthening of production market linkage, an acceleration of livelihood program, aggressive assistance to organizational development of farmers, and assistance to agriculture-related priority programs of other government agencies.

Crop production The major crops produced in the municipality are lowland and upland rice and sugarcane. Other crops grown are corn, vegetables, root crops, and fruit trees.

These yielded an estimated  of assorted products.

Livestock and poultry production Livestock and poultry raising in the municipality are largely backyard family enterprises. Animals raised are generally for home consumption and an additional income source for the family. Total production of livestock and poultry in 1999 registered a head count of 7,907. Pigs raised both for human consumption or for breeding purposes are estimated at 1,675, while the equally popular poultry raising produced about 4,472 head. An estimated 1,013 head of cattle, 31 head of carabaos and 716 goats were also produced. Based on reports of the municipal Agricultural Officer, the total livestock and poultry production in the municipality is still below the sufficiency level for beef, pork meat and eggs.

Industry

Industrialization in the '90s accounts for the rapid growth of Carmona's business community from an otherwise quaint agricultural town in the 1950s. Brought about by huge capital from the national government, the industrial complexes bolstered the increase of the municipality's revenues and the change in the people's lifestyle.

There are eight existing industrial complexes in the towns. Its proximity to Manila and at the same time being the gateway to the Calabarzon area made Carmona a promising venue for business.

On the other hand, the local government has been very supportive of the investors. There are 114 factories in eight industrial parks/complexes to date.

Commercial and financial

One of the biggest commercial subdivisions in town is the Macaria Business Park in Barangay Mabuhay which houses a WalterMart branch in its  lot. Recently, fast food chains and restaurants have been opened to compete for regular patronage at the Paseo de Carmona in Barangay Maduya.

Moreover, numerous traders and retailers are housed in the bustling Carmona Public Market.

The bulk of commercial activities come from wholesale/retail enterprises, which comprise a total of 619 establishments. There are also service-related establishments: businesses, food shops and amusement operators, with 35 banks and other lending institutions.  Among the major banking institutions that cater to the financial needs of businesses in Carmona and neighboring towns are Bank of the Philippine Islands (BPI), Metrobank, Banco de Oro (BDO), Chinatrust Bank, Chinabank, Rizal Commercial Banking Corporation (RCBC), and Unionbank.

Government

Former municipal mayors
Mayors:
 Marcelino P. Clarito
 Marcelo Reyes
 Martin Reyes
 Prudencio Torres
 Marcelo Reyes (re-elected)
 Juan R. Alumia
 Estanislao G. Paular (1931–1937)
 Marciano Mapanoo (1938–1941)
 Candido G. Hebron (1942–1943)
 Juan Zamora (1943–1944)
 Alfredo Anulat (1944–1945)
 Arsenio Mapalad (1945–1946)
 Bernardo B. Hebron (1946–1955)
 Eulalio Reyes (1955–1956)
 Cesar E. Casal (1956–1979)
 Felino L. Maquinay (1980–1986)
 Estelito Torres (OIC, 1986–1988)
 Felino Maquinay (1988 – February 1990)
 Rolando Rosas (February 1990 – 1995)
 Roy M. Loyola (1995–2004; 2007–2010; 2019–2022)
 Dahlia A. Loyola (2004–2007; 2010–2019; 2022–present)

Healthcare

The Pagamutang Bayan ng Carmona ( and the Rural Health Unit (RHU) are government-owned and run healthcare facilities in the town.

The main health center in the municipality is located in Barangay 4. A total of eleven barangay health centers or substations of the RHU are established in different barangays.

In addition to the rural health units and the Pagamutang Bayan, there are also private clinics and hospitals operating in the municipality. Eleven clinics are privately owned and one clinic is under the supervision of government health workers.

Education

The education sector in Carmona improved in many aspects of endeavor. In line with the local government's thrust of enhancing quality education, the Department of Education (DepEd), particularly the District of Carmona and Carmona National High School, with the full support of the local government unit, implemented various programs and projects that intensified the education sector in achieving its goals.

As early as 1995, various programs for the improvement of quality education started with a vision of producing competitive students from both the elementary and secondary levels. Carmona posted a literacy rate of 89%. The local government started with the computerization of all schools. Each public school was given computer units and students were provided with computer lessons. This is in consonance with the belief that modern technology and equipment are considered factors in enhancing better education. To address the increasing number of enrollees and students, the LGU conceptualized the construction of 2-story buildings in different schools in Carmona.

At present, the municipality has a substantial number of classrooms and teachers to meet the learning needs of the school age population. As of School Year 2005–2006, the municipality has 50 educational institutions, 28 of which are public schools while 17 are privately run. The public schools are categorized into 18 pre-schools, 9 elementary, 1 junior high school, 1 senior high school and 1 tertiary school. The private educational institutions are composed of 10 pre-schools, 7 elementary, 3 secondary/high school, and a computer college.

References

External links

[ Philippine Standard Geographic Code]

Official website of Cavite
Official website of Carmonians

 
Municipalities of Cavite